Reint E. Gropp (born 21 December 1966, in Bottrop) is a German economist, the President of the Halle  Institute for Economic Research (IWH)  as well as professor of economics at Otto-von-Guericke University Magdeburg. His fields of research cover financial economics, macroeconomics, corporate finance as well as money and banking.

Life
Gropp studied economics at the University of Freiburg and the University of Wisconsin, Madison. He obtained his PhD in economics from the University of Wisconsin in 1994.
He worked for the International Monetary Fund in Washington, D.C. from 1994 to 1999 and for the European Central Bank from 1999 to 2007, most recently as Deputy Head of the Financial Research Division. After that, Gropp was professor of financial economics and taxation at EBS University Wiesbaden until 2012. From 2012 to 2014, he held a Chair of Sustainable Banking and Finance at the House of Finance, Goethe University Frankfurt am Main.

Since November 2014, Gropp is President of the Halle Institute for Economic Research and professor of economics at  [Otto-von-Guericke University Magdeburg. He is Fellow of the Center for Financial Studies, Frankfurt am Main, and Associate Editor of the Review of Finance. He serves as a consultant for the Bank of Canada and the Federal Reserve Bank of San Francisco.

Gropp made headlines in 2019 when his institute published a study proving that East German companies are 20 percent less productive than their West German equivalents. Gropp blamed the continuous subsidy policy and recommended no longer supporting rural areas but focusing on cities instead.

Affiliations

 Fellow, Center for Financial Studies (CFS), Frankfurt am Main
 Visiting Professor, University of Amsterdam (2014)
 Visiting Financial Economist, Federal Reserve Bank of San Francisco (2012)
 Duisenberg Fellow, European Central Bank, Frankfurt am Main (2012)

Selected publications
 Spillover Effects among Financial Institutions: A State-Dependent Sensitivity Value-at-Risk Approach, in: Journal of Financial and Quantitative Analysis 2014 (with Z. Adams, R. Füss)
 The Impact of Public Guarantees on Bank Risk-Taking: Evidence from a Natural Experiment, in: Review of Finance 2014 (with C. Gruendl, A. Guettler)
 How Important are Hedge Funds in a Crisis?, in: Federal Reserve Bank of San Francisco Economic Letters 2014
 Competition, Risk-shifting, and Public Bail-out Policies, in: Review of Financial Studies 2011 (with H. Hakenes, I. Schnabel)
 A New Metric for Banking Integration, in: Europe and the Euro, University of Chicago Press 2010 (with A. Kashyap)
 The Revenue Effect of Trade Liberalization, in: IMF Occasional Papers 1999 (with L. Ebrill, J. Stotsky)
 The Effect of Bankruptcy Exemptions on Credit Demand and Supply, in: Quarterly Journal of Economics 1997 (with J. Scholz and M. White)

References

 CV with complete list of publications at  www.iwh-halle.de 
 Reint Gropp at www.fww.ovgu.de
 Reint Gropp at www.wiwi.uni-frankfurt.de
 Profile at RePEc

1966 births
Living people
German economists